Margaret Mayo (born 7 February 1936 in Staffordshire, England) is a British writer of over 80 romance novels since 1976.

Biography
Margaret Mayo was born on 7 February 1936 in Staffordshire, England. She left school at fifteen, and learned shorthand and typing, to work as a secretary for many years. At 22, she married and had two children, Adrian and Tina.

At 40, she began to publish romantic novels to Mills & Boon.

Bibliography

Single novels

Destiny Paradise (1976)
Land of Ice and Fire (1976)
Perilous Waters (1976)
Shades of Autumn (1976)
Rainbow Magic (1977)
Sea Gypsy (1977)
Tregenna Tyrant (1977)
Autumn Deception (1978)
Afraid to Love (1978)
Unwilling Wife (1979)
Mistaken Marriage (1979)
Stormy Affair (1979)
Valley of the Hawk (1979)
Burning Desire (1980)
Pirate Lover (1980)
Innocent Bride (1980)
Tormented Love (1980)
Taste of Paradise (1981)
Charming Enemy (1981)
Divided Loyalties (1981)
Diamond Stud (1981)
Dangerous Journey (1982)
Bitter Reunion (1982)
Impossible Masquerade (1982)
Emerald Coast (1982)
Marriage Game (1983)
Return a Stranger (1983)
Branded (1984)
Devil's fancy (1984)
Personal Vendetta (1984)
Compelling Force (1985)
Second Encounter (1985)
At Daggers Drawn (1986)
Passionate Vengeance (1986)
Impulsive Challenge (1986)
Savage Affair (1987)
Painful Loving (1987)
Unexpected Inheritance (1988)
Prisoner of the Mind (1988)
Bittersweet Pursuit (1988)
Conflict (1989)
Mutual Attraction (1990)
An Impossible Situation (1990)
A Fiery Encounter (1991)
Stormy Relationship (1991)
Reluctant Hostage (1991)
Intrigue (1991)
Yesterday's Dreams (1992)
Ruthless Stranger (1993)
Determined Lady (1994)
Wild Injustice (1994)
A Vengeful Infatuation (1995)
Powerful Persuasion (1996)
Ungentlemanly Behaviour (1997)
Dangerous Game (1999)
Marriage by Contract (2000)
The Wife Seduction (2000)
Her Wealthy Husband (2001)
Reclaiming His Bride (2004)
The Italian's Ruthless Baby Bargain (2008)
Baby mine (2008) e-book
The Santorini Marriage Bargain (2009)
The Twelve-Month Marriage Deal (2009)
Married Again to the Millionaire (2010)
A Night With Consequences (2011)
A Secret Too Far (2012) e-book
Abby's Unexpected Bodyguard (2013) e-book
Rachel's Retribution (2014) e-book

First Class Series Multi-Author
Trapped (1990)

Island Dreams Series Multi-Author
Bitter Memories (1994)

Island Romances Series Multi-Author
Stolen Feelings (1995)

Dark Secrets Series Multi-Author
A Forbidden Marriage (1998)

An Engagement of Convenience Series Multi-Author
Forgotten Engagement (1998)

Mediterranean Passions Series Multi-Author
The Mediterranean Tycoon (2002)

Mistress Material Series Multi-Author
Surrender to the Millionaire (2003)

Marriage and Mistletoe Series Multi-Author
Her Husband's Christmas Bargain (2004)

Ruthless! Series Multi-Author
At the Spaniard's Convenience (2006)
Bedded at His Convenience (2007)

Forced to Marry Series Multi-Author
Bought for Marriage (2006)

The Boss's Mistress Series Multi-Author
The Rich Man's Reluctant Mistress (2007)

The Billionaire's Convenient Wife Series Multi-Author
The Billionaire's Blackmail Bargain (2008)

Omnibus In Collaboration
Island of Escape / Stormy Affair / Hostile Engagement (1987) (with Dorothy Cork and Jessica Steele)
Kowhai Country / Not the Marrying Kind / A Taste of Paradise (1990) (with Gloria Bevan and Helen Dalzell)
Escape to Greek Affairs (2006) (with Sara Craven)
Married to a Millionaire (2007) (with Sandra Field and Lee Wilkinson)
Mistresses: Bought with Emeralds (2010) (with Katherine Garbera and Sandra Marton)
The Greeks' Bought Brides (2010) (with Julia James and Lucy Monroe)
The Spaniard's Pleasure (2010) (with Kim Lawrence and Lucy Monroe)

References and resources

1936 births
Living people
English romantic fiction writers
English women novelists
Women romantic fiction writers